The 1959 NCAA University Division Cross Country Championships were the 21st annual cross country meet to determine the team and individual national champions of men's collegiate cross country running in the United States. Held on November 23, 1959, the meet was hosted by Michigan State University at the Forest Akers East Golf Course in East Lansing, Michigan. The distance for the race was 4 miles (6.4 kilometers). 

All NCAA University Division members were eligible to qualify for the meet. In total, 13 teams and 113 individual runners contested this championship.

The team national championship was won by the Michigan State Spartans, their eighth. The individual championship was won by Al Lawrence, from Houston, with a time of 20:35.94.

Men's title
Distance: 4 miles (6.4 kilometers)

Team Result

See also
NCAA Men's Division II Cross Country Championship

References
 

NCAA Cross Country Championships
NCAA University Division Cross Country Championships
Sports competitions in East Lansing, Michigan
NCAA University Division Cross Country Championships
Track and field in Michigan
NCAA University Division Cross Country Championships
Michigan State University